Events in the year 2001 in Greece.

Incumbents

Events

January

February

March

April

May

June

July

August

September

October

November

December

References

 
Years of the 21st century in Greece
Greece
2000s in Greece
Greece